José Luis Rodríguez González, nicknamed El Puma (Cougar) (January 14, 1943), is a Venezuelan singer and actor who is known for having recorded many international super hits and participated in a handful of telenovelas. He also served as a coach and mentor on the Peruvian and Argentine version of The Voice, as well as a judge on X Factor Chile.

Life and career
José Luis Rodríguez was born in Caracas, Venezuela to José Antonio Rodríguez from the Canary Islands, Spain and Ana González a Venezuelan housewife. He lost his father at the age of six, and was raised by his mother (an illiterate then, learned to read as an adult to read the Bible) along with 11 brothers and sisters. He grew up in very modest conditions, having to shine shoes, and pack bags in a supermarket for a living at an early age. Without an academic formation, he shaped himself as a singer and actor by empirical means.

As his mother participated in the revolt against Marcos Pérez Jiménez (holding weapons and hiding politicians in her home), Rodríguez lived in exile in Ecuador with her and his brother, for a couple of years.

In 1974 Rodriguez was selected by Venevision to represent Venezuela in the third edition of the prestigious OTI Festival which was held in the Mexican city of Acapulco. There, his entry, the song "Vuélvete" (Return) found a warm reception, therefore gaining recognition for his country by winning the third place prize with 11 points.

Rodríguez surfaced in his homeland in the late 1960s and early 1970s, and was able to build a fan base there. He also participated in a famous commercial, along with his family during that time, for Ace detergents. Rodríguez went to Puerto Rico, where he participated in the Telenovela Cristina Bazán, alongside Johanna Rosaly and young Adamari López. It was there that he received his nickname, El Puma. Later, he also made the telenovela, El ídolo, with Cuban actress Marilyn Pupo, playing Omar Contreras (a.k.a. El Puma).

Rodríguez's main money revenue, however, was his singing career. His hits included Dueño de nada, Pavo real and Agárrense de las manos. With the second, he caused controversy at the 1982 contest of Miss Universe, which was being held in Lima, Peru; the song's main issue was interracial marriage.

Later, Rodríguez participated in the Latin American Spanish version of Meet the Robinsons, La Familia del Futuro, as Wilbur Robinson's father. El Puma also starred in an advertising campaign for Wrigley's Eclipse gum, with the spot drawing on his persona, using humor and kitsch to highlight the tagline, "Libera el Puma que hay en tí" (Free the puma within). Another commercial that drew on his puma persona during that era was one for Snickers chocolate bars.

In May 2009, Rodriguez joined the cast of the miniseries, Gabriel, produced for the Hispanic audience in the United States by Megafilms and transmitted by Mega TV. The miniseries, released in November of the same year is based on the themes of vampirism and occultism.

In July 2012 he was a judge and voice trainer on La Voz... Argentina (Argentine version of The Voice) that was broadcast on Telefe. Along with co-presenters Fernán Martínez and Carolina Ramírez, he served as a judge on a dance program called La Pista which was aired on Caracol TV in Colombia. In the same year he also made a cameo appearance in the film, Casa de mi Padre, starring Will Ferrell.

In August 2013, Rodríguez was part of the first season of La Voz Perú, where he was coach for one of the four teams. On December 20th, one of his pupils, young Daniel Lazo, placed first in the competition, making Rodríguez the first winning coach in the history of La Voz Perú.

In September 2013 in an interview with the Peruvian newspaper, La República, Rodríguez expressed that he would continue to perform music but cease to produce records because of piracy.

Personal life
Rodríguez was married to Lila Morillo from 1966 to 1986. They are the parents of actresses Lilibeth Morillo and Liliana Rodríguez.  Rodríguez fathered Génesis Rodríguez with Cuban-born model Carolina Pérez, whom he ultimately married in 1997.

Health
He underwent a double lung transplant due to pulmonary fibrosis in December 2017.

Select album discography 
 1963: 2 Sets Con Billo
 1964: Billo En Colombia
 1964: Billo En Santo Domingo
 1964: Cantares De Navidad
 1964: Billo En Puerto Rico
 1965: El Yo-Yo
 1965: Billo Y Su Música
 1965: Fin de Año
 1965: Mosaico 17
 1966: La Renga
 1966: Anoche no dormí
 1966: De 1937 a 1966 Bailando con Billo
 1966: Felices Fiestas
 1967: Se necesitan dos
 1974: Mi Fe
 1975: Los Temas De Mis Telenovelas
 1976: Una Nueva Canción
 1977: Una Canción De España (TH/Top Hits)
 1977: Jose Luis De América
 1979: Voy A Perder La Cabeza
 1980: Atrévete
 1980: Cantando Éxitos De Siempre (Discos CBS International)
 1982: La Historia Del Idolo
 1982: Dueño De Nada
 1983: Ven CBS Columbia
 1984: Voy A Conquistarte (Discos CBS International)
 1984: Due Come Noi (Discos CBS International)
 1985: El Último Beso (Discos CBS International)
 1987: Señor Corazón
 1988: Con El Mariachi Vargas
 1989: Tengo Derecho A Ser Feliz
 1989: Las 15 Grandes De El Puma
 1990: Serie De Colección
 1990: 12 Grandes Éxitos
 1990: Esta Vez
 1990: Senora Bonita
 1991: El Puma En Ritmo
 1992: Piel de Hombre
 1993: Querido Puma
 1994: Razones Para Una Sonrisa
 1995: Boleros De Siempre Con José Luis Rodríguez
 1996: Llamada Del Amor
 1996: Joyas Musicales
 1996: Lo Mejor De José Luis Rodríguez
 1997: Que Quiere Esa Musica Esta Noche
 1997: Inólvidable
 1999: En Ritmo 2: Fiesta
 2000: Serie Millennium 21
 2000: Mis 30 Mejores
 2001: Inolvidable, Vol. 3
 2002: Mis 30 Mejores Canciones Con Los Panchos
 2002: Champagne
 2002: Serie De Autores, Vol. 1: Manuel Alejandro
 2002: Serie De Autores, Vol. 3: P. Herrero y J.L. Armenteros
 2002: Serie De Autores, Vol. 4: Chema Puron
 2002: Serie De Autores, Vol. 5 Chema Puron
 2002: Mujer
 2004: Mi Historia
 2005: Distancia
 2005: Sabor A México
 2005: Mis 30 Mejores Canciones
 2006: Canciones De Amor
 2006: Ayer Y Hoy
 2006: 15 Éxitos
 2007: Trópico
 2007: Homenaje a José Alfredo Jiménez
 2008: Interpreta A Manuel Alejandro
 2009: Los Grandes Del Amor
 2009: Mi Amigo El Puma
 2017: Inmenso

Telenovelas 
 1963: Cuentos para mayores
 1966: Cantando nace el amor
 1967: Donde no llega el sol
 1967: Club musical
 1967: El retrato de mamá
 1968: Pent House
 1969: Las golfas
 1969: El roble
 1970: La satánica
 1970: El ciego
 1970: Los Juniors
 1971: La consentida de papá
 1972: Indio
 1972: Porque los hombres pecan
 1972: Simplemente María
 1972: Alma Rosa
 1973: Chinita mi amor
 1974: Una muchacha llamada Milagros as Omar Contreras "El Puma"
 1975: Isabelita
 1975: Señorita Elena
 1975: Mamá
 1976: Carolina
 1977: Tormento
 1977: La Hija de Juana Crespo
 1978: Cristina Bazán
 1978: Residencia de señoritas
 1979: Sangre azul
 1979: Estefania
 1980: El Idolo
 1985: Angelica
 1986: Atrevete
 1986: Mi encuentro con Teresa
 1987: Sueño contigo
 1992: Piel as Vicente
 2007: Trópico as Guillermo Guzmán
 2008: Gabriel, amor inmortal as Francisco Pizarro

Reality shows
  2022 - Canta Conmigo Ahora 1 (Judge)
  2014 - La Voz Perú 2 (Judge)
  2013 - La Voz Perú 1 (Judge)
  2012 - La Voz Argentina 1 (Judge)

See also
Music of Venezuela (Musica Llanera)

References

External links 
 

1943 births
Living people
People from Caracas
20th-century Venezuelan male singers
Venezuelan people of Canarian descent
Venezuelan people of Spanish descent
Venezuelan male telenovela actors
Venezuelan emigrants to the United States
Sony Music Latin artists
Venezuela in the OTI Festival
Latin Grammy Lifetime Achievement Award winners